This article lists the winners and nominees for the Black Reel Award for Best Actor in a Motion Picture. As of 2016, Denzel Washington has the most wins with 4 and nominations with 10. Chiwetel Ejiofor is also a multiple winner in this category with 2 wins. Both Bernie Mac and Jamie Foxx were the only recipients of the Outstanding Actor awards in Musical/Comedy and Drama.

Winners and nominees
Winners are listed first and highlighted in bold.

† indicates an Academy Award–winning performance.
‡ indicates an Academy Award–nominated performance that same year.

2000s

2010s

References

Black Reel Awards